Lieutenant General Themba Matanzima  is a former South African Army officer, serving as Military Ombudsman.

He was born on 2 February 1953 in Cofimvaba. He joined the Transkei Defence Force in January 1977.

Army career
Matanzima transferred to the South African National Defence Force on integration in 1994. After a period on the Joint Military Coordinating Committee that oversaw the integration process, he then became General Officer Commanding Eastern Province Command in 1996. In 1998 he became Chief of Army Personnel.

In 1999 he was appointed  Chief of Personnel and promoted to the rank of lieutenant general. In 2000, the SANDF restructured and he was appointed into a newly created post of Chief of Joint Support.

In 2004 he was appointed Chief of Corporate Staff until 2005, when he became Chief Human Resources.

He appointed Chief of Joint Operations on 1 September 1, 2007 after the death of Lt Gen Sipho Binda in car accident in 2006.

In 2010 he served as acting Secretary for Defence and Acting CSANDF on a number of  occasions.

Honours and awards

Medals 
He has been awarded the following:

Other

References

1953 births
Living people
South African Army generals
Graduates of the Royal College of Defence Studies